Naalumanippookkal is a 1978 Indian Malayalam film,  directed by K. S. Gopalakrishnan and produced by T. R. Srinivasan. The film stars Madhu, Sreedevi, Kaviyoor Ponnamma, Adoor Bhasi Pattom Sadan and M. G. Soman in the lead roles. The film has musical score by G. Devarajan.

Cast

Madhu
Kaviyoor Ponnamma
Adoor Bhasi
Pattom Sadan
Sreedevi
Aranmula Ponnamma
M. G. Soman

Soundtrack
The music was composed by G. Devarajan and the lyrics were written by Bichu Thirumala.

References

External links
 

1978 films
1970s Malayalam-language films
Films directed by K. S. Gopalakrishnan